Prince Karl of Bavaria (1 April 1874 – 9 May 1927) was a member of the Bavarian Royal House of Wittelsbach and a Major General in the Bavarian Army.

Early life and military career
Karl was born at Villa Amsee near Lindau in Bavaria. He was the second son of King Ludwig III of Bavaria and his wife Archduchess Maria Theresia of Austria-Este.
Like his older brother Crown Prince Rupprecht, Karl joined the Bavarian Army and eventually reached the rank of Major General.

Death
Karl died  in Munich and is buried in the crypt of the famous Frauenkirche in the Bavarian capital.

Ancestry

References
 Das Bayernbuch vom Kriege 1914-1918, Konrad Krafft von Dellmensingen, Friedrichfranz Feeser, Chr. Belser AG, Verlagsbuchhandlung, Stuttgart 1930
 C. Arnold McNaughton, The Book of Kings: A Royal Genealogy, in 3 volumes (London, U.K.: Garnstone Press, 1973), volume 1, page 469.

1874 births
1927 deaths
People from the Kingdom of Bavaria
People from Lindau
Bavarian generals
Princes of Bavaria
House of Wittelsbach
Recipients of the Iron Cross (1914)
Burials at Munich Frauenkirche
Sons of kings